Green is an impact crater in the Argyre quadrangle of Mars.  It is named after Nathan E. Green, a British astronomer (1823-1899).

Description
Debris flows have been observed on some of the dunes in this crater.  Some researchers believe that they may be caused by liquid water.  Liquid water could be stable for short periods of time in the summer in the southern hemisphere of Mars.  These gully-like debris flows  may be due to small amounts of ice melting.

Dunes
Barchan dunes are present in Green crater and visible in pictures below.  When there are perfect conditions for producing sand dunes, steady wind in one direction and just enough sand, a barchan sand dune forms. Barchans have a gentle slope on the wind side and a much steeper slope on the lee side where horns or a notch often forms.

See also 
 List of craters on Mars
 Gullies on Mars

References 

Argyre quadrangle
Impact craters on Mars